The M4, officially referred to as the M4 Kadıköy - Sabiha Gökçen Airport metro line, is a , 23-station rapid transit line of the Istanbul Metro. Running between Kadıköy and Sabiha Gökçen Airport, it is the first rapid transit line operating on the Asian side of Istanbul. The M4 mostly runs under State road D100, parallel to the Istanbul-Ankara railway and is entirely underground.

History
A plan to build a subway line on the Asian side of İstanbul was approved in 2005. In 2008, a 751 million construction contract was awarded to a consortium of Astaldi, Makyol and Gülermak. The rolling stock was ordered from the Spanish company CAF. In mid-2010, the construction of the tunnels was completed and the track laying started. The route has connections with TCDD's Marmaray system at Ayrılıkçeşmesi and the Istanbul Metrobus system at Ünalan. The scheduled opening date was December 2011 up to Kartal, but it was postponed because of  signalization works.

The M4 opened on 17 August 2012 with a large ceremony in Kadıköy, attended by Prime Minister Recep Tayyip Erdoğan. On 29 October 2013, with the opening of Marmaray rail service under the Bosphorus, Ayrılık Çeşmesi station was opened to allow passengers to transfer between lines. On 10 October 2016, 3 new stations were added to the line (Yakacık Station, Pendik Station and Tavşantepe Station).  On 2 October 2022, 4 new station were added to the line (Fevzi Çakmak Station, Yayalar Station, Kurtköy Station and Sabiha Gökçen Airport Station). Thus, the length of the line reached 34 km.

Stations 
The M4 has a total of 23 stations in operation, with 6 more under construction.

Specifications
The stations Kadıköy, Ayrılıkçeşmesi, Ünalan and Göztepe are situated below sea level. The Operation Control Center of the line is situated in Esenkent and the depot is located in Maltepe. Another depot is to be built in Kaynarca in 2016 when the line extends there .

Train frequency is currently every 150 seconds during peak hours and could be shortened to 90 seconds later on. Trains remain at stations for an average of 15 seconds. Four-car trains have a 1,000 passenger capacity and eight-car trains have 2,000 capacity. Ridership capacity in one direction is 70,000 passengers hourly. Total travel time of the entire line is around 40 minutes.

Rolling Stock
M4 is operated by CAF trains (144 cars in total) every 150 seconds during peak hours. The frequency is much less on weekends and during off-peak hours.

See also 
 Istanbul modern tramways
 Istanbul nostalgic tramways
 Marmaray
 Public transport in Istanbul
 Istanbul Metro

References

External links 

 

Istanbul Metro
Transport infrastructure under construction in Turkey
Transport in Kadıköy
Ataşehir
Maltepe, Istanbul
Kartal
Pendik
Railway lines opened in 2012
Airport rail links in Turkey